Zoltán Adamik (20 October 1928 – 7 December 1992) was a Hungarian sprinter who competed in the 1952 Summer Olympics. He was born in Szolnok.

References

External links
 

1928 births
1992 deaths
Hungarian male sprinters
Olympic athletes of Hungary
Athletes (track and field) at the 1952 Summer Olympics
People from Szolnok
Sportspeople from Jász-Nagykun-Szolnok County
20th-century Hungarian people